The esophageal glands are glands that are part of the digestive system of various animals, including humans.

In humans
Esophageal glands in humans are a part of a human digestive system. They are a small compound racemose exocrine glands of the mucous type.

There are two types: 
 Esophageal glands proper- mucous glands located in the submucosa. They are compound tubulo-alveolar glands. Some serous cells are present. These glands are more numerous in the upper third of the esophagus. They secrete acid mucin for lubrication.
 Esophageal cardiac glands- mucous glands located near the cardiac orifice (esophago-gastric junction) in the lamina propria mucosae. They secrete neutral mucin that protects the esophagus from acidic gastric juices. They are simple tubular or branched tubular glands. 
 There are also mucous glands present at the pharyngo-esophageal junction in the lamina propria mucosae. These are simple tubular or branched tubular glands.

Each opens upon the surface by a long excretory duct.

In monoplacophorans
Oesophageal gland is enlarged in large monoplacophoran species.

In gastropods
Oesophageal gland or oesophageal pouch is a part of the digestive system of some gastropods. Oesophageal gland or pouch is a common feature in so-called basal gastropod clades, including Patelloidea, Vetigastropoda, Cocculiniformia, Neritimorpha and Neomphalina.

The size of oesophageal gland of scaly-foot gastropod Chrysomallon squamiferum (family Peltospiridae within Neomphalina) is about two orders of magnitude over the usual size. The scaly-foot gastropod houses endosymbiotic Bacteria in the oesophageal gland. Chrysomallon squamiferum was thought to be the only species of Peltospiridae, that has enlarged oesophageal gland, but later it was shown that both species Gigantopelta has the oesophageal gland also enlarged. In other peltospirids, the posterior portion of the oesophagus forms a pair of blind mid-oesophageal pouches or gutters extending only to the anterior end of the foot (Rhynchopelta, Peltospira, Nodopelta, Echinopelta, Pachydermia). The same situation is in Melanodrymia within the family Melanodrymiidae. Bathyphytophilidae and Lepetellidae are also known to have enlarged oesophageal pouches, however, though not to the extent of Chrysomallon. Both are known to house endosymbiotic bacteria, in the case of bathyphytophilids most likely also in the oesophageal glands but in the lepetellids the endosymbionts are spread in the haemocoel.

References
.
This article incorporates Creative Commons (CC-BY-4.0) text from the reference

External links
 
 

Digestive system
Glands